Parnel Legros  (Parnell)) is a former Olympic level judoka for the nation of Haiti. He was born on November 11, 1956.

Martial arts
Legros competed in the 1992 Summer Olympics in Barcelona. He competed in the Half Heavyweight division (95 kg), finishing 21st.

Coaching
From 1993 to 2002, 1500 students passed through his judo program at Starett City.  Legros for a period ran the largest judo program in the northeast.

He won the Real Judo award for Coach of the Year in 2002.  Legros received the Sloan Public Service Award from Mayor Rudy Giuliani as a result of his success with youth in judo. 100% of his judo students went on to college.

Legros has been a clinician for the USJF.

He was a speaker at the funeral of Rena Kanakogi.

Legros works as a gym teacher at Intermediate School 364.  He was noted as a teacher who made an attempt to save the life of a student, who died after playing football.

Notable students
 Barry Kirk Jackman
 Dariusz Mikolajczak - 2008 Olympic Trials Bronze Medalist.
 Harry St. Leger
 Garry St. Leger

See also
 Haiti at the 1992 Summer Olympics

External links
 Legros' personal website

References

Living people
Judoka trainers
American male judoka
Martial arts school founders
Judoka at the 1992 Summer Olympics
1956 births
Olympic judoka of Haiti
Haitian male judoka